Bessemer is a city in the U.S. state of Michigan. As of the 2020 census, the city population was 1,805. It is the county seat of Gogebic County.

The city is surrounded by Bessemer Township, but the two are administered autonomously. It is on U.S. Route 2 with Ironwood to the west and Wakefield to the east. The Big Powderhorn, Blackjack, and Indianhead ski areas are located within a few miles of Bessemer. Cross-country skiing and snowmobiling are also very popular in this area, due to lake-effect snow influenced by nearby Lake Superior; the area is often referred to as "Big Snow Country." Recreational opportunities in the summer months include Bluff Valley Park, the scenic Black River Falls, and access to the Iron Belle Trail.

History 

In 1880, a hunter and trapper Richard Langford, discovered iron ore under an overturned birch tree. However, Captain N. D. Moore is credited with disclosing the ore which led to the development of the Colby property. Mining began in 1883. By 1884, the Milwaukee Lake Shore and Western Railroad (later the Chicago and Northwestern) was being built from Antigo, WI to Ashland, WI by way of the new mines. The railroad company plotted the town of Bessemer in 1884. On June 4, 1886 Gogebic County was separated from Ontonagon County. In March 1887, 360 voting members assembled and voted to organize the village of Bessemer. In the same year Gogebic County was officially created by the Michigan Legislature. Also in the year Bessemer and Ironwood called an election to see which city would be the county seat and also have the Gogebic County Courthouse. Ironwood men traveling to Bessemer to vote were made drunk and the train did not stop at the voting site. Ironwood lost and Bessemer gained the county seat. From 1884 to December 31, 1958, a period of seventy-five years, the iron ore shipment from all of Gogebic County totaled over 245 million tons. In 1966 the last mine in Bessemer, the Peterson Mine, closed. Many left the area to work in car factories in Kenosha, and the local economy underwent a serious decline.

Bessemer is named for Sir Henry Bessemer (1813-1898), English inventor of steel manufacturing.

Government 
Bessemer is operated by an elected 5-member city council with day-to-day operations run by an appointed city manager. Staff also consists of administrative staff, public works department, and library staff. Bessemer also belongs to the Gogebic Range Water Authority.

City Council
 Mayor Adam Zak (2017 - )
 Mayor Pro-Tem Rob Coleman (2016 - )
 Councilman Terry Kryshak (2017 - )
 Councilman Charlie Tirpik (2021 - )
 Councilwoman Linda Nelson (2009 - )

City Manager

 Jennifer Adams (2022 - )
 Charly Loper (2016 - 2022)

Geography
Majority of Bessemer is situated on the north side of Colby Hill and the city consists of many hills and valleys.

Demographics

As of 2000 the median income for a household in the city was $27,639, and the median income for a family was $36,739. Males had a median income of $28,958 versus $21,708 for females. The per capita income for the city was $17,499. About 8.6% of families and 12.1% of the population were below the poverty line, including 17.0% of those under age 18 and 7.9% of those age 65 or over.

2010 census
As of the census of 2010, there were 1,905 people, 888 households, and 511 families residing in the city. The racial makeup of the city was 96.4% White, 0.5% African American, 0.9% Native American, 0.3% Asian, 0.3% from other races, and 1.6% from two or more races. Hispanic or Latino of any race were 0.7% of the population.

There were 888 households, of which 24.5% had children under the age of 18 living with them, 42.9% were married couples living together, 10.6% had a female householder with no husband present, 4.1% had a male householder with no wife present, and 42.5% were non-families. 38.3% of all households were made up of individuals, and 19.4% had someone living alone who was 65 years of age or older. The average household size was 2.11 and the average family size was 2.76.

The median age in the city was 45.4 years. 20.3% of residents were under the age of 18; 9.1% were between the ages of 18 and 24; 20.1% were from 25 to 44; 29.5% were from 45 to 64; and 21% were 65 years of age or older. The gender makeup of the city was 49.1% male and 50.9% female.

News/media

Newspapers 

 Ironwood Daily Globe
 Wakefield News/Bessemer Pick & Axe

Area Radio Station Coverage 

 WIMI 99.7 FM (Classic Rock)- Ironwood
 WJMS 590 AM (Talk/Country)- Ironwood
 WUPM 106.9 FM (Top 40/Variety)- Ironwood
 WHRY 1450 AM/102.9 FM (Oldies)- Hurley
 WRJO 94.5 FM (Oldies)- Eagle River
 WJJH 96.7 FM (Classic Rock)- Ashland
 WBSZ 93.3 FM (Country)- Ashland
 WUPY 101.1 FM (Country)- Ontonagon
 WUWS 90.9 FM (Wisconsin Public Radio)- Ashland
 WHBM 90.3 FM (Wisconsin Public Radio)- Park Falls

Local Television Station Coverage 

 WLUC TV 6 (Marquette)-NBC/FOX
 WNMU (Marquette)-PBS
 KDLH (Duluth)-CBS
 KBJR (Duluth)-NBC
 WDIO (Duluth)-ABC
 KQDS-TV (Duluth)-FOX

Notable people

 Otto Binder, science fiction and comic book author (Mary Marvel, Legion of Super-Heroes, and Supergirl); born in Bessemer
 Kevin Borseth, women's basketball coach at The University of Wisconsin-Green Bay; born in Bessemer
 Jay W. Johnson, U.S. congressmen for Wisconsin's 8th congressional district; born in Bessemer
 Arthur Redner, halfback for Fielding H. Yost's 1901 "Point-a-Minute" football team; lived in Bessemer
 Al Rossi, Olympic bronze medalist in rowing at the 1952 Summer Olympics; born in Bessemer
 Richard A. Sofio, Michigan state representative and educator; born in Bessemer.

Transportation 
 US Highway 2 is the Upper Peninsula's longest US Highway, stretching from St. Ignace to neighboring Ironwood. 
A section of the road is designated the Black River National Forest Scenic Byway.
 County Road 200 (Old County Road) begins at the southwest end of Bessemer and travels west to Ironwood.

Indian Trails provides daily intercity bus service between St. Ignace and Ironwood, while Gogebic County operates a small public bus system, the Gogebic County Transit Authority.

Commercial air service is available at the Gogebic-Iron County Airport (IWD) north of Ironwood.

References

External links

 Bessemer Herald, Google news archive. —PDFs of 1,343 issues, dating from 1894 to 1970.

Cities in Gogebic County, Michigan
1884 establishments in Michigan
County seats in Michigan
Populated places established in 1884